Gabriela Dabrowski and María José Martínez Sánchez were the defending champions, but Dabrowski chose to compete in Birmingham instead. Martínez Sánchez played alongside Andreja Klepač, but lost in the quarterfinals to Jelena Janković and Anastasija Sevastova.

Chan Yung-jan and Martina Hingis won the title by walkover when Janković and Sevastova withdrew from the final.

Seeds

Draw

Draw

References
 Main Draw

Mallorca Open - Doubles
Doubles